William Gowers may refer to:
William Frederick Gowers (1875–1954), British colonial administrator
William Gowers (neurologist) (William Richard Gowers, 1845–1915), British neurologist
Timothy Gowers (William Timothy Gowers, born 1963), British mathematician
Patrick Gowers (William Patrick Gowers, 1936–2014), an English composer

See also
Gowers, a surname
William Gower (born c. 1662), English Member of Parliament
William B. Gower (1873–1937), English-American businessman
Billy Gowers (born 1996), Australian rules footballer